Patrick Corey is an American Republican politician and state legislator from Maine. Corey represents Maine House District 25, comprising part of the town of Windham, Maine. During his fourth term from 20202022, Corey served on the Committee on Appropriations and Financial Affairs and the Committee on Veterans and Legal Affairs.

Personal life 
After graduating from the University of Southern Maine in 1997, Corey worked as a graphic designer. He is now self-employed as a creative director.

Political career 
After winning an uncontested primary election, Corey was first elected to the Maine House in 2014. He defeated Democrat Jennie Butler 56.2%–43.8%.

References 

Year of birth missing (living people)
Living people
21st-century American politicians
Republican Party members of the Maine House of Representatives
University of Southern Maine alumni
People from Windham, Maine